Brett Galea (born 25 June 1972) is an Australian former professional rugby league footballer who played professionally for the Brisbane Broncos and Adelaide Rams.

His brother, Paul, also played professionally for Gold Coast and North Queensland Cowboys.

Playing career
Galea was a Fortitude Valley Diehards junior before joining the Brisbane Broncos in the NSWRL Premiership in 1992. He won the clubs Rookie of the Year award that year and remained with the club until the end of the 1996 season.

In 1997 Galea joined the new Adelaide Rams franchise and played in their inaugural match. He remained with the Rams for two seasons.

In 1999 Galea played for the Magpies in the Mackay District Rugby League competition and won the Patton Medal.

References

1972 births
Living people
Australian rugby league players
Brisbane Broncos players
Adelaide Rams players
Fortitude Valley Diehards players
Rugby league players from Brisbane
Rugby league second-rows